Jeff Ltd. is a Canadian television series. The half-hour-long series stars Jeff Seymour of The Eleventh Hour, and was aired on The Comedy Network. The show follows Jeff Stevens, an advertising exec who thinks he can have any lady he wants. He spends a lot of time trying to get with the ladies, and less time doing his work.

The show aired two seasons. In 2007, the show was not included on CTV's fall schedule, although it was later added to the schedule of CTV's sister network A.

Episode list

Season 1
The World According to Jeff
The Truth, the Whole Truth, and Nothing But the Truth
Tears of a Clown
Ali Baba and the 40 Carpets
In the End You Get What You Deserve
From Zero to Hero
They Call Him Leatherman
It's What They Do to Bulls
Body by Jeff
The Camera Never Lies
Some of My Best Friends Are Queer
Nightmare on Stevens Street
To Kill a Mocking Man

Season 2
Too Many Hens in the Foxhouse
...You Love Men
The Manipulator
A Fishy Award
The Accidental Hero
The Auto-Fish 9000
The Accidental Hero, Part 2
The Model Man
Size Matters
The Yachtsman
Contra-Dynamantics
Jeff de Bergerac
I Want to be Your Daddy

References

External links
Official CTV site
Official Comedy Network site
 

CTV Television Network original programming
CTV 2 original programming
2000s Canadian sitcoms
CTV Comedy Channel original programming
Television series by S&S Productions
Television shows filmed in Toronto
2006 Canadian television series debuts
2007 Canadian television series endings
2000s Canadian workplace comedy television series